Let It Come Down is the first solo album by American guitarist James Iha. It was released in 1998, during which Iha was still with the Smashing Pumpkins, before the release of Adore. Iha took on a more acoustic country sound reminiscent of the songs he contributed to the Pumpkins, notably shying away from the darker sound of Billy Corgan's songwriting.

Iha had said that the quieter tone of the songs reflected the fact that many of them were written in his hotel rooms during the Smashing Pumpkins tours, and he did not want to disturb other guests by playing too loudly.

"Be Strong Now" was released as a 4-track single, featuring the bonus studio tracks "Falling", "My Advice" and "Take Care", and as a two-track promo single where the other track is a 12-second call out hook. Both versions of the "Be Strong Now" single feature the same cover. There is also an extended promo version of the single called "Be Strong Now (With Intro)" lasting 3:35.

Additionally, the song "Jealousy" was released as a promo single, without any B-sides.

The album was remastered and re-issued in February 2012 with the three tracks previously released as B-sides added as bonus tracks.

Track listing

Personnel
 James Iha – vocals, acoustic and electric guitars, bass, producer, string arrangements, production
 Neal Casal – harmony vocal, electric guitar
 Greg Leisz – pedal steel, lap steel and electric guitars, bass on "Lover, Lover"
 Adam Schlesinger – piano, bass on "Country Girl"
 Solomon Snyder – bass
 John Ginty – Hammond organ, piano
 Matt Walker – drums, percussion
 Curt Bisquera – percussion
 Eric Remschneider – cello
 James Sanders – violin
 Stacia Spencer – violin on "Silver String"
 Jim Goodwin – saxophone on "Jealousy"
 Ralph Rickert – trumpet on "Jealousy"
 D'arcy Wretzky – harmony vocal on "One and Two"
 Nina Gordon – harmony vocal on "Beauty"
 Tonya Lamm and Shawn Barton – harmony vocal on "No One's Gonna Hurt You" and "Country Girl"
 Eric Remschneider – string arrangement

Additional personnel
 Dave Menet – guitar tech
 Russ Spice – equipment
 Chris Billheimer – art direction
 Jeremy Goldberg – cover photograph
 Anette Aurell – back photograph
 James Iha, Kevin Wells, Larry Hirshowitz – collage photographs
 Lou Kregel, Patti West – illustrators
 Todd Tatnall – Pro Tools editing

Production
 Jim Scott – production
 Scott Humphrey – post-production
 Podboy – post-production
 Flood – post-production on "One and Two"
 Jim Scott – engineering
 Steve Spapperi – additional engineering
 Jim Scott – mixing
 Mike Scotella – mix assistance
 Stephen Marcussen – mastering

Charts

References

James Iha albums
1998 debut albums
Virgin Records albums